Black Lion Reggae Invasion Vol. 1 is a compilation of reggae and dancehall songs released by Black Lion Music and Tropic Electric on February 24, 2015.

Eight of the ten songs featured on the compilation were produced / co-produced by Black Lion. One song was produced by The Wizard (Quati Wut) and one song was produced by Torsten Scroth (Come For Free).

Nyanda is one of the main artists on the compilation. Her single, "Slippery When Wet", spent five weeks on UK’s Music Week Top 30 Urban Club Chart.

Epic recording Artist, Kat Dahlia, is featured on Mash It Up. Co-produced by Black Lion & The Wizard, "this song's piano-heavy production forms a pitch-perfect platform for dancehall's over-the-top braggadocio."  The music video for "MASH IT UP" was filmed in "the gritty dancehall of Jamaica" and premiered on The Fader November 12, 2014.

Other artists featured on the compilation include Mr. Vegas, Assassin, The Kemist, Esco and Dionne Renée.

Executive producers
Chez Gayle

Track listing

Music videos

References

2015 compilation albums
Reggae albums by Jamaican artists
Reggae compilation albums
Dancehall albums